Lubień is a village in the administrative district of Gmina Ośno Lubuskie, within Słubice County, Lubusz Voivodeship, in western Poland. 

The village has a population of 260.

References

Villages in Słubice County